Busigny is a commune in the Nord department in northern France. Busigny station has rail connections to Douai, Paris, Lille, Maubeuge and Saint-Quentin.

Population

Heraldry

See also
Communes of the Nord department

References

Communes of Nord (French department)